The Rhumb Line is the debut LP for the Syracuse-based indie rock band Ra Ra Riot. Recorded in late 2007 with Ryan Hadlock in Woodinville, WA, the band released their debut album on August 19, 2008, through Seattle-based indie label Barsuk Records. The album peaked at #109 on the Billboard 200. This album was ranked as the 38th best album of 2008 by Rolling Stone.

Songs
The track listing includes the Kate Bush cover "Suspended in Gaffa". Other songs, "Ghost Under Rocks", "Each Year", "Dying Is Fine", and "Can You Tell", previously appeared on the band's 2007 self-titled EP. Also, during a WOXY.com Lounge Act session (January 30, 2008), the band showcased "Too Too Too Fast", "Oh, La", and "Run My Mouth". Several of the songs contained in the album are literary references such as "Each Year" which appears to be written about Harper Lee's To Kill a Mockingbird and "Dying Is Fine" using the poem by E.E. Cummings.  "St. Peter's Day Festival" commemorates the loss of bandmate John Pike, who went missing in June 2007 but was later found dead in Buzzard's Bay. The album was named after The Rhumb Line, a bar in Gloucester, Massachusetts that is referenced in the lyrics of "St. Peter's Day Festival".

Track listing
All tracks written by Ra Ra Riot (Wes Miles, Mathieu Santos, Milo Bonacci, Alexandra Lawn, Rebecca Zeller), except where noted.

 "Ghost Under Rocks" (John Pike, Ra Ra Riot) – 4:26
 "Each Year" (John Pike, Ra Ra Riot) – 3:16
 "St. Peter's Day Festival" (John Pike, Wes Miles) – 3:34
 "Winter '05" – 2:57
 "Dying Is Fine" (John Pike, Wes Miles, e. e. cummings) – 3:52
 "Can You Tell" – 2:42
 "Too Too Too Fast" (John Pike, Ra Ra Riot) – 3:46
 "Oh, La" – 4:42
 "Suspended in Gaffa" (Kate Bush) – 3:48
 "Run My Mouth" – 3:58.

Videos
 : Directed by Albert Birney, Nicholas Gurewitch, and Jon Moses.
 "Ghost Under Rocks": Directed by Brian Savelson.
 "Can You Tell": Directed by Taryn Gould and Emily Kowalczyk.

Personnel
 Wes Miles – vocals, keyboards
 Mathieu Santos – bass guitar
 Milo Bonacci – guitar
 Rebecca Zeller – violin
 Alexandra Lawn – cello
 Cameron Wisch – drums

References

External links
Official website
MySpace website
Barsuk Records
Daytrotter Session
WOXY.com Lounge Act Session

Ra Ra Riot albums
2008 albums
Albums recorded at Bear Creek Studio